This is a list of the first women lawyer(s) and judge(s) in South America. It includes the year in which the women were admitted to practice law (in parentheses). Also included are the first women in their country to achieve a certain distinction such as obtaining a law degree.

KEY
 FRA = Administrative division of France
 GBR = British overseas territory of the United Kingdom

Argentina

Lawyers 
 María Angélica Barreda (1909): First female lawyer in Argentina
María Romilda Servini: First female lawyer to work as a prosecutor in Argentina's criminal justice system (1974). She later became the first judge (and female) to return two minors appropriated during the civil-military dictatorship (1976-1983).
Rosa Chiquichano (1999): First female lawyer of Tehuelche (Mapuche) origin in Argentina. She was also the first Mapuche female lawyer in the Chubut Province, Argentina.
Jordana Duarte Martinelli (2020): First Guarani female lawyer in Argentina

General Defender and Attorney General 

 Stella Maris Martínez: First female to serve as the General Defender of the Nation of Argentina (2006)
 Alejandra Gils Carbó: First female to serve as the Attorney General of Argentina (2012)

Judicial officers 
 Maria Luisa Anastasi de Walger: First female judge in Argentina (1955)
 Margarita Argúas (1925): First female appointed as the Minister (Judge) of the Supreme Court of Argentina (1970)
 Alicia Oliveira: First female to serve as a Judge of the Juvenile Correctional Court of the Federal Capital in Argentina (1973)
 Elsa Kelly:  First female judge of the International Tribunal for the Law of the Sea (2011)
 Silvia Fernandez de Gurmendi: First Argentinian female appointed as the President of the International Criminal Court (2015)
 Verónica Gómez: First Argentinian female to serve as a Judge of the  Inter-American Court of Human Rights (2016)

Bolivia 

 Esilda Villa (1929): First female lawyer in Bolivia
 María Josefa Saavedra: First female appointed as a Minister (Judge) of the Supreme Court of Justice of Bolivia (1972)
 Elena Lowenthal: First female appointed as the Vocal (District Judges) for the Superior Court of Bolivia (2002)
 Amalia Morales: First Aymara female to become a judge in Bolivia (2010)
 Cristina Mamani: First indigenous (Aymara) female elected as a judge in Bolivia (2011)
 Abigail Salas: First female candidate for the Attorney General of Bolivia (2012). Salas was unsuccessful, as she was disqualified from the race.

Brazil

Law Degree 
Maria Coelho da Silva Sobrinha, Maria Fragoso e Delmira Secundina da Costa and Maria Augusta C. Meira Vasconcelos: First females to obtain law degrees in Brazil (1888-1898)

Lawyers 
Esperança Garcia: First female (an enslaved Black woman) to act as an attorney in Brazil (1770)
Myrthes Gomes de Campos (1906):  First female lawyer in Brazil (though she practiced the profession of lawyer beginning in 1899)
Maria José Saraiva: First female lawyer to present a case before a Jury Court in Brazil 
Zuleika Sucupira Kenworthy: First female to hold the position of prosecutor in Brazil and Latin America (specifically in São Paulo from 1948 to 1978)
Joênia Wapixana (1997): First indigenous (Wapishana) female lawyer in Brazil. She was also the first female lawyer to argue a case before the Supreme Court of Brazil.
Adriana Pinheiro: First Kanamari (Ticuna) female lawyer in Brazil

Attorney General and Prosecutor General 

Grace Mendonça: First female appointed as the Attorney General of Brazil (2017)
Raquel Dodge (1986): First female appointed as the Prosecutor General of Brazil (2017)
Geovana Scatolino Silva: First female to hold the position of federal corregerator-general of the Public Prosecutor's Office (Brazil) (2018-2019)

Judicial officers 
Ellen Gracie Northfleet: first woman to be appointed justice of the Supreme Court of Brazil (2000) and Brazil's first female Chief Justice (2006)
Auri Moura Costa: First female municipal judge in Brazil (1939). She was also the first female to serve as a Judge of Law (1968).
Thereza Grisólia Tang and Ana Maria da Silveira: First female judges in Brazil (1954)
Sônia Taciana Sanches Goulart: First female to serve as a Labor judge in Brazil (1960)
Mary de Aguiar Silva: First female Black judge appointed in Brazil (1962)
 Maria Rita Soares de Andrade: First female appointed as a federal judge in Brazil (1967). She was also the first female lawyer in the states of Bahia and Sergipe.
Maria Thereza de Andrade Braga Haynes: First female to serve as a Judge of the Justice of the Federal District and Territories (1974) and its President (1988)
Lydia Dias Fernandes: First female judge to serve as a President of a Court of Justice in Brazil (Court of Justice of Pará; 1979–1981)
Ana Maria Goffi Flaquer Scartezzini, Anna Maria Pimentel, Lúcia Valle Figueiredo Collarile and Diva Prestes Marcondes Malerbi: First females to serve as Judges of the then newly created Federal Regional Court of the Third Region of Brazil (1989). Pimentel was the first female to serve as the court's President (2003). 
Cnea Cimini Moreira de Oliveira: First female to serve as a Minister of the Supreme Labor Court of Brazil (1990-1999)
 Eliana Calmon: First female to serve as a Minister of the Superior Court of Justice of Brazil (1999-2013)
 Sylvia Steiner: First Brazilian (female) to serve as a Judge of the International Criminal Court (2003)
Maria Elizabeth Guimarães Teixeira Rocha: First female to serve as a Minister of the Superior Military Court of Brazil (2007) and well as its President (2014)
Nancy Andrighi: First female elected as the General Corrector (Electoral General Attorney) of the Superior Electoral Court of Brazil (2011)
Carmen Lúcia Antunes Rocha: First female Minister to serve as President of the Superior Electoral Court of Brazil (2012)
Carla Santillo: First female to serve as the President of the State Audit Court of Brazil (2015)
Laurita Hilário Vaz: First female to serve as the President of the Superior Court of Justice of Brazil (2016)
Cristina Peduzzi: First female Minister to serve as the President of the Superior Labor Court of Brazil (2020)

Chile 
 Matilde Throup (1892): First female lawyer in Chile
 Claudina Acuña Montenegro (1923): First female judge in Chile (1925)
Mónica Maldonado Croquevielle: First female to serve as the Judicial Prosecutor of the Supreme Court of Chile (1960)
Fannie Leibovich Guberman: First female to serve as a Minister (Judge) and President of a Court of Appeals in Chile (upon her appointment as a Minister and later the President of the Court of Appeals of Valparaíso in 1971 and 1972 respectively)
Luz Bulnes Aldunate: First female to serve as a Judge of the Constitutional Court of Chile (1989)
María Antonia Morales Villagrán: First female appointed as a Minister (Judge) of the Supreme Court of Chile (2001)
Cecilia Medina: First (Chilean) female to serve as the President of the Inter-American Court of Human Rights (2008)
Olga Feliú: First female to serve as the President of the Chilean Bar Association (2011)
Solange Huerta: First female to serve as the Chief Prosecutor of any Prosecutor's Office in Chile (2012)
Marisol Peña: First female to serve as the President of the Constitutional Court of Chile (2013)
María Paz Constanza Jaramillo Loaiza: First female lawyer sworn in by the Court of First Instance and Guarantee of Rapa Nui (2021) [Chile's Easter Island]

Colombia 
 Rosa Rojas Castro (1942): First female lawyer and judge (1943) in Colombia
 Berta Zapata Casas (1947): First female magistrate of the Supreme Court of Justice of Colombia. She is also the first female lawyer to graduate from the University of Antioquia and the first female President of the Superior Court of Medellín. [Antioquia Department, Colombia]
Fabiola Aguirre: First female magistrate in Colombia (1952)
 Fanny González Franco (1958): First female appointed as a Justice of the Supreme Court of Justice of Colombia (1984). During the 1960s, she became the first female to serve as a Minister of the Superior Court of Pereira [Risaralda Department, Colombia]. She was also the first female to study law at the Pontifical Bolivarian University. 
Rosa Aydée Anzola Linares: First female to serve as a Counselor of the Council of State (Colombia) (1978)
Eva Marina Pulido de Barón: First female appointed as a magistrate of the Criminal Chamber of the Supreme Court of Justice of Colombia (2002)
Clara Inés Vargas Hernández: First female to serve as a Judge of the Constitutional Court of Colombia (2001) and its President (2003)
 María del Rosario González de Lemus: First female appointed as the President of the Criminal Chamber of the Supreme Court of Justice of Colombia (2010)
 Viviane Morales Hoyos: First female appointed as the Attorney General of the Nation of Colombia (2011-2012)
 Ruth Marina Díaz Rueda: First female justice appointed as President of the Supreme Court of Justice of Colombia (2013). She was also the first female magistrate of the Court of San Gil, Colombia (1993).
 Belkis Florentina Izquierdo Torres: First indigenous (Arhuaco) female to serve as an Auxiliary Magistrate of the Superior Council of the Judiciary of Colombia (2014)

Ecuador 
 Obdulia Luna (1928): First female lawyer in Ecuador
 Fanny León Cordero: First female judge in Ecuador (1947)
 Mariana Yépez Andrade (1971): First female appointed as a prosecutor (c. 1975) in Ecuador. She is also the first female to serve as a Judge of the Superior Court of Justice in Quito (1975-1978). She is also the first female Attorney General of Ecuador (1999). 
 Mariana Yumbay: First indigenous (Waranka) female judge in Ecuador (2012)
Beliza Coro Guairacaja (2012): First Puruhá female lawyer in Ecuador
Ruth Seni Pinoargote: First female to serve as the President of a Superior Court of Justice in Ecuador [Portoviejo, Manabí Province], as well as the first female Minister (Judge) of the Constitutional Court of Ecuador
María Paulina Aguirre: First female judge to serve as President of the National Court of Justice of Ecuador (2018)

Falkland Islands (GBR) 
 Rosie McIlroy: First woman lawyer (non-native) to enter into private law practice in the Falkland Islands. According to various sources, her legal career also included serving as Crown Solicitor (c. 1987), Senior Magistrate (c. 1989), and Chief Magistrate (c. 1989) in the Falkland Islands.
 Melanie Louise Best Chilton: First woman lawyer (non-native) to serve as Law Commissioner and an Attorney General of the Falkland Islands (2006-2007).
 Rosalind Catriona Cheek (United Kingdom, 1998): First Falkland Islander female to become Principal Crown Counsel (2006). She later became the second female Law Commissioner in the Falkland Islands (2015).

French Guiana (FRA) 
 Hélène Sirder (1978): First female Guyanese lawyer in French Guiana. She became the first female Bâtonnière of the Guyane Bar Association in 1992.
 Constance Rézaire-Loupec (c. 1970): First female magistrate in French Guiana (1978)

Guyana 
 Iris de Freitas Brazao (1929): Considered the first female lawyer in the Anglophone Caribbean, Brazao practiced law in Guyana when it was known as British Guiana
 Ena Luckhoo: First Indian female lawyer in Guyana
 Désirée Bernard (1964): First female judge in Guyana (upon her appointment as a Judge of the High Court of Guyana in 1980). She is also the first female appointed as a Justice of Appeal in the Court of Appeal of the Supreme Court of Guyana (1992), Chief Justice (1996), Chancellor of the Judiciary of Guyana and the Caribbean (2001) and Judge of the Caribbean Court of Justice (2005).

Paraguay 
 Serafina Dávalos (1907): First female lawyer and judge in Paraguay (she became a member of the Superior Court of Justice of Paraguay in 1910)
 Myriam Peña Candia: First female prosecutor (1977) and Judge of the Court of First Instance in Paraguay (1980). In 2021, she became the first Paraguayan (female) to run for the position of Judge of the Inter-American Court of Human Rights. 
Amparo Maura Samaniego de Paciello: First female to serve as the President of the Paraguayan Bar Association
Alicia Beatriz Pucheta de Correa: First female to serve as a Minister (Judge) of the Supreme Court of Paraguay, as well as its President (2007-2008; 2016–2017)
Luciana Ferreira Barboza (2018): First Yshyr female lawyer in Paraguay
 Sandra Quiñónez: First female appointed as the Attorney General of Paraguay (2018)

Peru 

 Trinidad María Enríquez (1878): First Peruvian woman to earn a law degree. Enriquez was denied the ability to practice law and fought her case until her death in 1891. [Peru]
 Rosa Perez Liendo (1920): First female lawyer in Peru. She later became the first female to hold a managerial position at the Lima Bar Association. 
 Marcela Montenegro Cannon (1966): First female appointed as a Judge of Lands of Peru (1976)
 Blanca Nélida Colán: First female to serve as the Prosecutor of the Nation of Peru (1992)
Elcira Vásquez (1963): First female appointed as the Supreme Vocal for the Supreme Court of Justice of Peru (1993)
Beatriz Merino: First female to serve as the Public Defender (Ombudsman) of Peru (2005-2011). She was also the first Peruvian woman to graduate from Harvard Law School in 1977. 
 Delia Revoredo de Mur: First female appointed as a Judge of the Constitutional Court of Peru
 Luz del Carmen Ibáñez Carranza: First Peruvian (female) elected as a Judge of the International Criminal Court (2017)
Marianella Leonor Ledesma Narváez: First female to serve as the President of the Constitutional Court of Peru (2020)
Elvia Barrios Alvarado: First female to serve as the President of the Supreme Court and of the Judicial Power of Peru (2021)

South Georgia and Sandwich Islands (GBR)
 Rosalind Catriona Cheek: First female appointed as the Acting Attorney General (28 March 2011; 21 November 2017) and Acting Coroner (21 November 2017)
 Alison Anne Mackenzie Inglis: First female appointed as the Registrar General (7 February 2012)
 Clare Faulds: First female appointed as the Senior Magistrate and hence also Coroner (on 3 November 2014), also of the Falkland Islands and British Antarctic Territory

Suriname 
 Martha Henriëtte Kreps (1958): First female lawyer in Suriname. She was preceded by an unknown woman who became the first female to pass the bar exam in Suriname in 1933, but supposedly did not practice.
 Rosemarie Currie: First female notary in Suriname (c. 1970s)
Héloïse Rozenblad: First female prosecutor in Suriname (1980).  She was also the first female to serve as the Attorney General of the High Court of Justice of Suriname (appointed 1997).
Cynthia Valstein-Montnor (c. 1956): First female judge in Suriname (upon becoming a member of the High Court of Justice of Suriname in 1998). She became the first female to serve as the Vice-President of the High Court of Justice in 2010.
Gloria Karg-Stirling: First female to serve as the President of the newly formed Constitutional Court of Suriname (2020)
Anoeradha Akkal-Ramautar, Rinette Djokarto, and Maya Fokké-Manohar: First females to serve as members of the newly formed Constitutional Court of Suriname (2020)

Uruguay 
 Clothilde Luisi (1911): First female lawyer in Uruguay
 Sofía Álvarez Vignoli: First female (a lawyer) elected as Senator in Uruguay (1942)
 Sara Fons de Genta (c. 1955): First female appointed as the Minister (Judge) of the Supreme Court of Justice of Uruguay during the Uruguayan Dictatorship (1981-1985)
 Jacinta Balbela (1945): First female appointed as the Minister (Judge) of the Supreme Court of Justice of Uruguay upon the return to democracy (1985-1989). In 1987, she became the first female to serve as the President of the Supreme Court of Justice of Uruguay.
 Graciela Gatti: First Uruguyan female to serve as the President of the International Residual Mechanism for Criminal Tribunals (Mechanism) (2022)

Venezuela 
 Luisa Amelia Perez Perozo: First female lawyer in Venezuela
 Panchita Soublette Saluzzo: First female judge in Venezuela
 Josefina Calcano de Temeltas: First female appointed as a Justice of the Supreme Court of Venezuela (c. 1979)
 Cecilia Sosa (1967): First female appointed as the President of the Supreme Court of Justice of Venezuela (1996-2000)
 Luisa Ortega Díaz: First female appointed as the Prosecutor General (or Attorney General) of Venezuela (2007-2017)
Indira Alfonzo Izaguirre: First female justice appointed as the Vice President of the Supreme Tribunal of Justice in Venezuela (c. 2015)

See also 
Justice ministry
List of first women lawyers and judges by nationality
 List of first women lawyers and judges in Africa
 List of first women lawyers and judges in Asia
List of first women lawyers and judges in Europe
 List of first women lawyers and judges in North America
List of first women lawyers and judges in Oceania
 List of first women lawyers and judges in the United States
 List of the first women holders of political offices in South America

References

Women, South America, first
Lawyers, South America, first
Women, lawyers, first
Women in South America
Law in South America